James Wilde may refer to:

 James Wilde, 1st Baron Penzance (1816–1899), British judge and gardener
 Jimmy Wilde (1862–1969), Welsh boxer

See also
 Jimmy Wilde (disambiguation)
 James Wild (disambiguation)
 James William Wild
 James Wyld
 James Hart Wyld